"Entertainment 2.0"  is a song by Jamaican dancehall recording artist Sean Paul, featuring vocals from Juicy J, 2 Chainz and Nicki Minaj. The song was released as a digital download on 10 October 2013 through Atlantic Records as the second single from his sixth studio album Full Frequency (2014).

Chart performance

Release history

References

2013 songs
2013 singles
Sean Paul songs
Songs written by Sean Paul
Songs written by Juicy J
Songs written by 2 Chainz
Songs written by Nicki Minaj